2nd AFCA Awards

Best Film:
United 93

The 2nd Austin Film Critics Association Awards, honoring the best in filmmaking for 2006, were announced on January 2, 2007.

Top 10 Films
 United 93
 The Departed
 Pan's Labyrinth (El laberinto del fauno)
 Brick
 Children of Men
 Borat
 The Queen
 Little Children
 The Prestige
 The Fountain

Winners
 Best Film:
 United 93
 Best Director:
 Alfonso Cuarón – Children of Men
 Best Actor:
 Leonardo DiCaprio – The Departed
 Best Actress:
 Elliot Page – Hard Candy
 Best Supporting Actor:
 Jack Nicholson – The Departed
 Best Supporting Actress:
 Rinko Kikuchi – Babel
 Best Original Screenplay:
 Pan's Labyrinth (El laberinto del fauno) – Guillermo del Toro
 Best Adapted Screenplay:
 Children of Men – Alfonso Cuarón, Timothy J. Sexton, David Arata, Mark Fergus, and Hawk Ostby
 Best Cinematography:
 Children of Men – Emmanuel Lubezki
 Best Foreign Film:
 Pan's Labyrinth (El laberinto del fauno) • Mexico / Spain / United States
 Best Documentary:
 This Film Is Not Yet Rated
 Best Animated Film:
 Cars
 Best First Film:
 Rian Johnson – Brick
 Breakthrough Artist:
 Jennifer Hudson – Dreamgirls
 Austin Film Award:
 A Scanner Darkly – Richard Linklater

References

External links
 IMDb page
 Official Website

2006 film awards
2006